Budapesti Honvéd SE created a fencing section in 1950, which had one of the most successful teams in Hungary.

Achievements

Current squad

Technical and Managerial Staff
Fencing team officials according to the official website:

Athletes

Men's squad

Women's squad

Fencing Hall
Name: Tüzér utcai Vívócsarnok
City: Budapest, Hungary
Address: H-1134 Budapest, XIII. district, Dózsa György út 55.

International success

Olympic medalists
The team's olympic medalists are shown below.

World Championships

European Championships

Notable former fencers

Sabre
 Bertalan Papp 
 Rudolf Kárpáti
 Péter Bakonyi
 Tibor Pézsa
 Rudolf Nébald
 György Nébald

Épée
 Ernő Kolczonay
 Hajnalka Kiraly
 Tímea Nagy
 Krisztián Kulcsár
 Géza Imre
 Gábor Boczkó
 Hajnalka Tóth
 Péter Somfai

Foil
 Ilona Elek
 Margit Elek
 József Gyuricza
 Mária Gulácsy
 Zsuzsa Jánosi
 Edina Knapek
 Gabriella Varga

See also
Hungarian Fencer of the Year

References

External links
Fencing section website 
Official Budapesti Honvéd SE website 

Budapesti Honvéd SE
Sports clubs established in 1950
Fencing clubs